The Big Thing is a Canadian short black comedy film, directed by Carl Laudan and released in 2004. The film imagines the end of the world in 1889, at the hands of Lucifer (Robin Wilcock) and Michael (Andrew Simms).

The film was a Genie Award nominee for Best Live Action Short Drama at the 26th Genie Awards in 2006.

The film was broadcast by CBC Television in 2007 as part of the short film series Canadian Reflections.

References

External links
 

2004 films
2004 short films
Canadian black comedy films
2000s English-language films
Canadian drama short films
Canadian comedy short films
2000s Canadian films